Joseph Esilifie Hagan was a Ghanaian politician. He served as a regional commissioner for the Western Region, the Central Region and the Eastern Region. He also served as a member of parliament for the Abura-Asebu constituency and later the Abura constituency.

Early life and education
Hagan was born in 1912. He had his early education at Nyakrom Methodist School and continued at St. Nicholas Grammar School (now Adisadel College), Cape Coast.

Career and politics
After his secondary school education, Hagan was employed as a storekeeper by the Union Trading Company (U.T.C.) from 1937 to 1950. Hagan joined the Cape Coast Town Council and became a foundation member of the Convention People's Party in 1949. In 1951 he was elected as a member of the Legislative Assembly. As a member of the Legislative Assembly, he was the Assistant Government Whip. He was re-elected in 1954 and in 1956. That same year (1956), he was appointed ministerial secretary (deputy minister) to the Ministry of Local Government. In 1957, he was appointed Regional Commissioner (Regional Minister) for the Western Region he served in that capacity until 1960 when he was appointed Regional Commissioner for the Central Region. In 1965 he was appointed Regional Commissioner for the Eastern Region he remained in this position until 1966 when the Nkrumah government was overthrown.

References

1912 births
Year of death missing
Date of death unknown
Ghanaian MPs 1951–1954
Ghanaian MPs 1954–1956
Ghanaian MPs 1956–1965
Ghanaian MPs 1965–1966
Convention People's Party (Ghana) politicians
20th-century Ghanaian politicians
Alumni of Adisadel College